Cheriton is a village and civil parish near Alresford in Hampshire, England. 

The settlement is close to the site of the 1644 Battle of Cheriton, fought during the First English Civil War.

Facilities and Services
Cheriton has two pubs, and a local shop that contains a sub-post office. The Flower Pots Inn has its own microbrewery, and has won numerous awards for brewing over the past twenty years as attested to by the certificates adorning its walls. The community also enjoys the village hall, tennis courts and cricket pitches which offer a quintessentially English country scene.

The Church of England parish church dates from the 13th century and is dedicated to St Michael and All Angels. The chancel was extended in the 15th century and the tower, porch and aisle walls were rebuilt following a fire in 1744. It is a Grade I listed building.

About  to the east of the village is a monument to the Battle of Cheriton which was fought on 29 March 1644 and resulted in the defeat of the Royalist army.

References

External links
 Cheriton Cricket Club

Cheriton